Elkin Reynaldo González Donaire (born on September 29, 1980) is a Honduran football midfielder who currently plays for Real Sociedad in the Liga Nacional de Honduras.

Club career
González played the majority of his career for Real España.

He joined Hispano in summer 2010 and moved to second division Parrillas One from Real Sociedad in January 2012, but in July 2012 he resigned for newly promoted Real Sociedad.

González and compatriot Edgar Nuñez were injured in a car accident when playing for Guatemalan side Deportivo Xinabajul in January 2011.

International career
González made his debut for Honduras in an October 2003 friendly match against Bolivia and has earned a total of 12 caps, scoring no goals. He has represented his country at the 2005 UNCAF Nations Cup.

His final international was a February 2006 friendly against China.

References

External links 

1980 births
Living people
People from Comayagua Department
Association football midfielders
Honduran footballers
Honduras international footballers
Real C.D. España players
Hispano players
C.D. Real Sociedad players
Liga Nacional de Fútbol Profesional de Honduras players
Honduran expatriate footballers
Expatriate footballers in Guatemala
2005 UNCAF Nations Cup players